The Thames Valley Health Innovation and Education Cluster (TVHIEC) is a publicly funded partnership authorised by the Department of Health to improve innovation and education within the NHS across the Thames Valley. It was established on 1 April 2010 and is based in Oxford.
The Thames Valley Health Innovation and Education Cluster is one of seventeen HIECs established by the Department of Health in January 2010 to improve the quality of healthcare through increased innovation within health/social care and applied healthcare education across England. The themes of Thames Valley HIEC are:

Care Closer to Home

Patient Safety

Integrated Services

Capacity and Capability Development in Practice

Thames Valley HIEC is the mechanism by which ideas that promote the welfare of the patient make their way into working practice as soon as possible.

Thames valley is 15.1% short of cancer chemotherapy nurses and is 7% short of specialist cancer nurses.

Structure
The TVHIEC's governing body is the Board made up of representatives or partner organisations from NHS, Higher Education, Local Authorities, 3rd Sector and commercial organisations. The Chair leads the Board which is responsible for:

Directing the activities of the HIEC

Ensuring that the governance of the Thames Valley HIEC is developed and maintained

Ensuring engagement of partners

The Thames Valley HIEC Chief Executive, Dr. Catherine O'Sullivan,  is responsible for the day-to-day management of the organisation.

Partners
The following partners signed the original Memorandum of Understanding:

 Berkshire Healthcare NHS Foundation Trust
 Berkshire East PCT
 NHS Berkshire West (Berkshire West PCT)
 Buckjnghamshire PCT
 Buckinghamshire Hospitals NHS Trust
 Milton Keynes PCT
 Milton Keynes Hospital NHS Foundation Trust
 NHS Innovations South East Ltd
 Nuffield Orthopaedic Centre NHS Trust
 Oxfordshire and Buckinghamshire Mental Health NHS Foundation Trust
 Community Health Oxfordshire (Oxfordshire PCT)
 Oxford Radcliffe- Hospitals NHS Trust
 Ridgeway Partnership
 Royal Berkshire NHS Foundation Trust
 Heatherwood and Wexham Park Hospitals NHS Foundation Trust
 Buckinghamshire New University
 Open University
 Oxford Brookes University
 Thames Valley University
 University of Oxford
 University of Reading
 Aylesbury Vale Dtstrtct Council
 Bracknell Forest Council
 Buckingharnshire County Council
 Oxfordshire- County Council
 DIPEx
 Doctors.net.uk
 The Ethox Centre
 Unipart
 Oxfordshire Economic Partnership
 Picker Institute Europe
 Better Value Healthcare Ltd
 Knowledge into Action

References

External links
 

Medical and health organisations based in England
Organizations established in 2010
Health in Oxfordshire
Health in Buckinghamshire
2010 establishments in England